The Palaeontological Site Chiniquá is located in the Brazilian municipality of São Pedro do Sul, Rio Grande do Sul, along highway BR-287, about 70 kilometers west of the city of Santa Maria. The site occupies an area of about 250 hectares and is part of the geopark of paleorrota. It yielded fossils of Middle Triassic (Ladinian) age.

History
The Paleontological Site Chiniquá was discovered in the early 20th century, by researcher Antero de Almeida.

Historically Chiniquá is one of the most important paleontological sites in Brazil. Researchers collected fossil in the local, that drew the attention of international researchers who later visited the region. These local researchers shaped the  paleontological research in the region and Brazil. For all these contributions and historical factors, Chiniquá is now known internationally.

In 1925, the German paleontologist Dr. Bruno von Freyberg, University of Halle-Wittenberg, visited the site and ended up influencing Vicentino Prestes de Almeida, a surveyor who would learn how to collect fossils. In 1910, Vincentino,   was born in Chiniquá, when the site was then a district of Santa Maria, became self-taught on the subject and their findings had great influence at the coming of Von Huene for the region. Prestosuchus is named after a Vicentino Prestes de Almeida given by Von Huene.

In 1927, the Geologist Löfgren Alex  would come to Chiniquá, who is assisted by Atílio Munari.

In 1928 comes the German Friedrich von Huene, accompanied by Dr. Rudolf Stahlecker. They visited the site for two months, then had to travel 70 kilometers to Santa Maria taking tons of fossils, in carts drawn by oxen. Many fossils collected, stay at the University of Tübingen, Germany. During this period had been staying at the home of Abel Luiz da Silva Flores (Belo Flores).

In 1965, Romeu Beltrão visited Chiniquá, and talked with Gomercindo Ilha Flores and José Francisco Flores, local residents, who had helped in the collection of Stahleckeria potens by Von Huene.

In 1959, an expedition formed by Llewellyn Ivor Price, Edwin Harris Colbert, Carlos de Paula Couto, Fausto Luís de Souza Cunha and  Theodore, they collected fossils in Chiniquá.

From 1976 to 1984, priest Daniel Cargnin, was pastor of Mata City and began collecting fossils in the region.

Researchers who were at the site

 Antero de Almeida, (1901).
 Vicentino Prestes de Almeida
 Friedrich von Huene (1928).
 Rudolf Stahlecker (1928).
 Atílio Munari
 Llewellyn Ivor Price
 Edwin Harris Colbert
 Daniel Cargnin.
 Carlos de Paula Couto
 Romeu Beltrão
 Theodore E. White
 Bruno von Freyberg
 Alex Löfgren
 Fausto Luís de Souza Cunha

Fauna found 

 Prestosuchus chiniquensis
 Dinodontosaurus
 Chiniquodon
 Stahleckeria

Tourism paleontological 

Historically this is the second location where fossils were found in the Rio Grande do Sul, in the Geopark Paleorrota. Great researchers have gone through this site and helped form the Brazilian paleontology.

The place is abandoned, no signs, no panels telling the history of the site, without replication of the animals found there and no statues of the researchers. The site is known internationally for its outstanding contributions and is in a rural area on the edge of the highway BR-287, with great handling car. There is no project to make the place a tourist spot. Lack of responsibility and political involvement are on the part of municipal and state authorities.

See also 
 Paleontology

Notes

References

 Book: Os Fascinantes Caminhos da Paleontologia.  Author: Antônio Isaia. Comments: paleontologists tells the stories of Santa Maria and the region. 60 pages. Editora Pallotti (Portuguese).
 Book: "Cronologia Histórica de Santa Maria e do extinto município de São Martinho." 1787-1933. Vol I. Author: Romeu Beltrão, Editora Pallotti, 1958 (Portuguese).

External links 
 X Simpósio Brasileiro de Geografia Física Aplicada 
 Turismo no Rio grande do Sul. 
 Dinossauros do Rio grande do Sul. 
 Sociedade Brasileira de Paleontologia. 

Mesozoic paleontological sites of South America
Historical geology
Paleontological sites of Brazil
Triassic paleontological sites
Ladinian